A list of films produced in Argentina in 1947:

External links and references
 Argentine films of 1947 at the Internet Movie Database

1947
Films
Argentine